Ramón Mendiburu (born 12 March 1940) is a Spanish racing cyclist. He rode in the 1965 Tour de France.

After his career as a cyclists, Mendiburu became a race organizer. After the disastrous 1982 Vuelta a España, where the winner of the race was disqualified for doping, he managed to get the 1983 Vuelta shown live on Spanish television. This made it more interesting for sponsors, which increased the budget of the organisation and revived the Vuelta.

References

External links
 

1940 births
Living people
Spanish male cyclists
Place of birth missing (living people)
Sportspeople from San Sebastián
Cyclists from the Basque Country (autonomous community)